Hudson Middle School may refer to:
 Hudson Middle School - Pasco County Schools - Hudson, Florida
 Hudson Middle School - Hudson City School District (Ohio) - Hudson, Ohio
 B. G. Hudson Middle School - Garland Independent School District - Sachse, Texas
 Hudson Middle School - Hudson Independent School District - Hudson, Texas, near Lufkin